The Uzbekistan national under-20 football team represents Uzbekistan in international under-20 football competitions. It is controlled by the Uzbekistan Football Association and is a member of the Asian Football Confederation.

Tournament history

The Uzbekistan national under-19 football team's debut in AFC Youth Championship was in the 2002 tournament in Qatar. Uzbekistan U-19 qualified for the knockout stages of the tournament and in the quarter-final beat Syria 4–0. In the semi-final they faced Japan, losing 2–4 in a penalty shootout. In the third place match, the U-19 national team lost to Saudi Arabia. Their best performance in the AFC U-19 Championships was in 2008. In the 2008 AFC U-19 Championship the U-19 team finished runners-up, losing 1–2 in the final to UAE.

Uzbekistan national under-20 football team played three times in FIFA U-20 World Cups. In 2003 and 2009 the team exited in the group stage. In the 2013 World Cup in Turkey, the U-20 team made the play-off and in the Round of 16 beat Greece 3–1, but lost in the quarter-final to France 4–0.

In 2013, the Uzbekistan U-18 team qualified for the 2014 AFC U-19 Championship in Myanmar. They qualified for the quarter-final and beat Thailand U-19 2-1 qualifying directly to the 2015 FIFA U-20 World Cup. In the semi-final match held on 20 October 2014 Uzbekistan was beaten by North Korea 0:5.

Competitions

AFC U-19 Championship

FIFA U-20 World Cup

Managers

 Viktor Borisov, U20 (2003)
 Akhmadjon Ubaydullaev, U18- U20 (2007-2009)
 Marat Kabaev, U18- U19 (2009-2010)
 Ahmadjon Musaev, U18- U20 (2011-2013)
 Alexey Evstafeev, U18- U19 (2013-2014)
 Sergey Lushan, U19 (2014)
 Ravshan Khaydarov, U19- U20 (2014-2015)
 Jasur Abduraimov, U18- U19 (2015-2016)
 Alexander Mochinov, U18 (2017)
 Otabek Gulomkhujaev, U18- U19 (2018-2019)
 Timur Kapadze, u23-u20 (2021-)

Current squads

U-20
 The following players were called up for the 2023 AFC U-20 Asian Cup.
 Match dates: 1–18 March 2023
 Caps and goals correct as of:''' 18 March 2023

|-----
! colspan="9" bgcolor="#FFDEAD" align="left" | Goalkeeper
|----- bgcolor="#FFECCE"

|-----
! colspan="9" bgcolor="#B0D3FB" align="left" | Defender
|----- bgcolor="#E7FAEC"

|-----
! colspan="9" bgcolor="#BBF0C9" align="left" | Midfielder
|----- bgcolor="#DFEDFD"

|-----
! colspan="9" bgcolor="#FFACB3" align="left" | Forward
|----- bgcolor="#FFD2D6"

U-19

U-18

Previous squads

FIFA U-20 World Cup/Youth Championship squads
 2015 FIFA U-20 World Cup squads – Uzbekistan
 2013 FIFA U-20 World Cup squads – Uzbekistan
 2009 FIFA U-20 World Cup squads – Uzbekistan
 2003 FIFA World Youth Championship squads – Uzbekistan

AFC U-19 Championship squads
 2014 AFC U-19 Championship squads – Uzbekistan
 2012 AFC U-19 Championship squads – Uzbekistan
 2010 AFC U-19 Championship squads – Uzbekistan
 2008 AFC U-19 Championship squads – Uzbekistan

See also
 Uzbekistan national under-17 football team
 Uzbekistan national under-23 football team
 Uzbekistan national football team
 Uzbekistan national futsal team

References

External links
 Uzbekistan Football Federation
 FIFA profile: Uzbekistan U-20 at 2009 FIFA U-20 World Cup: Fixtures and Results
 AFC profile: Uzbekistan

u20
Asian national under-20 association football teams